East Ecclesfield ward—which includes the districts of Chapeltown and Ecclesfield—is one of the 28 electoral wards in City of Sheffield, England. The population of this ward in 2011 was 18,295 people in 7,863. East Ecclesfield is one of the six wards that make up the Sheffield Hillsborough Parliamentary constituency. The Boundary Commission for England, in their final report, recommended that East Ecclesfield should become part of a reformed Penistone and Stocksbridge constituency. The East Ecclesfield ward is composed of eight polling districts. These include Blackburn, Chapeltown, Ecclesfield, Ecclesfield Common, High Greave, Horbury, Warren and Wheata.

Districts in East Ecclesfield ward

Ecclesfield

Ecclesfield is a village, now a northern suburb of Sheffield.  It lies near the railway line from Sheffield to Barnsley.  Until 1953, Ecclesfield had a railway station.

Notable buildings in Ecclesfield include St Mary's Church and Ecclesfield Priory.

Chapeltown

Chapeltown lies to the north of Ecclesfield. It has its own railway station and at junction 35 on the M1 motorway.

Ecclesfield
Wards of Sheffield